Hilst is a municipality in Südwestpfalz district, in Rhineland-Palatinate, western Germany and belongs to the municipal association Pirmasens-Land.

References

Municipalities in Rhineland-Palatinate
Palatinate Forest
Südwestpfalz